The Old Familiar Juice is an Australian play by Jim McNeil. It was originally written and performed in prison and has come to be regarded as an Australian classic.

References

External links
The Old Familiar Juice at AusStage

Australian plays
1972 plays